According to the Hawaiian chants, Chief Maweke (also spelled Māweke in Hawaiian; Hawaiian pronunciation: MAH-WEH-KEH) was a chief of the highest known rank who lived in the 11th century. He is described in the legends as a wizard (or priest, kahuna in Hawaiian language) and an Aliʻi (a noble) of "the blue blood" (a Hawaiian nobleman of the highest rank). He was an ancestor of the royalty of the island of Oahu.

He was not of Hawaiian origin, but came to Hawaii from Tahiti and was famous for his knowledge of black magic. His famous ancestor was Nanaulu.

His parents are named in the chants as Kekupahaikala (father) and Maihikea (mother).

When he arrived to Oahu, Maweke erected a temple to the god called Kanaloa.

Maweke married woman named Naiolaukea (Naiolakea). They had children:
Mulielealiʻi
Kaehunui 
Kalehenui 
Keaunui, father of the High Chiefess Nuʻakea of Molokai 
Kamoeaulani

References 

Hawaiian chiefs
Legendary Hawaiian people
11th-century deaths
Legendary progenitors